Dream Warriors were a Canadian hip hop duo from Toronto, Ontario, comprising King Lou and Capital Q. Described as "a pair of deft, intelligent rappers" by John Bush of AllMusic, they were major contributors to the jazz rap movement of the early 1990s. Their 1991 debut album, And Now the Legacy Begins, was cited by Bush as one of the finest alternative hip hop records of the golden era. Before the release of their second album Subliminal Simulation in 1994, the duo became a group with the addition of rapper Spek and DJ Luv. In 1996, they released a third album, The Master Plan, before the two new members left the group a year later. Though their subsequent releases did not garner similar commercial success as their debut, the duo released a well-received greatest hits album in 1999. Their final album, The Legacy Continues..., was released in 2002.

History
King Lou (Louis Robinson) and Capital Q (Frank Allert) formed Dream Warriors in 1988, hailing from the Jane and Finch and Willowdale neighbourhoods of Toronto. The same year, King Lou made his recording debut, appearing on Michie Mee and L.A. Luv's single "Victory Is Calling", which also featured MC Lyte. The duo began working on music together in 1989 and joined the Beat Factory Productions team. In 1990 they collaborated on the one-off single "Can't Repress the Cause", a plea for greater inclusion of hip hop music in the Canadian music scene, with Dance Appeal, a supergroup of Toronto-area musicians that included Devon, Maestro Fresh Wes, B-Kool,  Michie Mee, Lillian Allen, Eria Fachin, HDV, Dionne, Thando Hyman, Carla Marshall, Messenjah, Jillian Mendez, Lorraine Scott, Lorraine Segato, Self Defense, Leroy Sibbles, Zama and Thyron Lee White.

They signed to 4th & B'way/Island Records and released their jazz-influenced debut album And Now the Legacy Begins in 1991. The album was critically acclaimed and sold well in Canada, the United Kingdom, and across Europe — before becoming an underground hit in the United States.

The album spawned the hit singles "Wash Your Face in My Sink", "My Definition of a Boombastic Jazz Style", and "Ludi". The first two singles hit the Top 20 in the UK, while in their own country, the album went gold and collected a Juno Award. The song "My Definition of a Boombastic Jazz Style" featured a sample of "Soul Bossa Nova" by Quincy Jones, which was the theme song for the Canadian game show Definition.

In 1992, they recorded "Man Smart, Woman Smarter" for the Buffy the Vampire Slayer soundtrack.

For their 1994 follow-up, Subliminal Simulation, Dream Warriors added rapper Spek (Hussain Yoosuf) and DJ Luv (formerly L.A. Luv; Phillip Gayle), turning the duo into a four-man group. The album received mixed reviews. It featured an appearance by Butterfly of Digable Planets and Gang Starr (Guru and DJ Premier) contributed to two tracks. Early production by Da Grassroots is found on the track "No Dingbats Allowed". Spoken word is also performed during the interludes. Two singles, "Day in Day Out" and "California Dreamin'", were released.

Dream Warriors released their third album The Master Plan in 1996, however, it was not released in the US. Three singles — "Float On", "What Do You Want 'Ladies'?", and "Sound Clash" (featuring Beenie Man) — supported the album. Later that year, they recorded a hip-hop version of the song "Edmonton Block Heater", which appeared on the compilation album A Tribute to Hard Core Logo. Spek left the group in 1997, before relocating to the UK. DJ Luv also left the group the same year. In 1999, Anthology: A Decade of Hits 1988–1998, a greatest hits compilation, was released on Priority Records. It featured two new tracks by the original duo. The compilation was critically acclaimed, with Robert Christgau stating: "Certainly they belong in the same sentence as De La Soul and A Tribe Called Quest." That year, the band performed in Hamilton as part of Showcase '99.

In 2002, they released their final album, The Legacy Continues..., exclusively in Canada. The Herbaliser produced the single "Road of Many Signs", which also appeared on their Very Mercenary album in 1999. Other singles included "Breathe or Die" and "Unstoppable".

In 2017, Icon, Dream Warriors' second compilation album, was released.

Discography
Studio albums
And Now the Legacy Begins (1991) – CAN #34, UK #18, AUS #53
Subliminal Simulation (1994)
The Master Plan (1996)
The Legacy Continues... (2002)

Compilations
Anthology: A Decade of Hits 1988–1998 (1999)
Icon (2017)

Singles

Awards and nominations
1991 Juno Awards
Rap Recording of the Year for "Wash Your Face in My Sink" (Nominated)
1992 Juno Awards
Rap Recording of the Year for "My Definition of a Boombastic Jazz Style" (Won)
1995 Juno Awards
Best Rap Recording for Subliminal Simulation (Nominated)
1997 Juno Awards
Best Rap Recording for The Master Plan (Nominated)

See also

Canadian hip hop
Music of Canada

References

Further reading

External links

Alternative hip hop groups
Black Canadian musical groups
Canadian hip hop groups
Juno Award for Rap Recording of the Year winners
Canadian musical duos
Musical groups established in 1988
Musical groups disestablished in 2002
Musical groups from Toronto
1988 establishments in Ontario
2002 disestablishments in Ontario